Hubertus Meyer-Burckhardt (born 24 July 1956 in Kassel) is a German author, television presenter and talkshow host.

Life 
He studied history and philosophy in Munich, Berlin and Hamburg. Meyer-Burckhardt works as television journalist on German broadcaster Norddeutscher Rundfunk. He is talk show host of German NDR Talk Show. As author he wrote several books. In several film and TV productions he worked as an actor.

Awards (selection) 
 2002: award of city Kassel
 five Goldene Löwen
 Bavarian TV Awards
 Nominination for Emmy Award
 three Adolf-Grimme-Awards 1998 for Das Urteil
 Adolf-Grimme-Award 1994 Sowieso – Die Sonntagsshow
 Nomination for Adolf-Grimme-Award 1992 as author, producer and moderator of ARD-production How much?

Books 
 Die Kündigung. Ullstein, Berlin 2011,  (Hörbuch: procella books/Hypertension, Hamburg 2011).
 Die kleine Geschichte einer großen Liebe. Bastei Lübbe, Cologne 2014, .
 Meine Tage mit Fabienne. Bastei Lübbe, Köln 2016,  (Lübbe Audio, Cologne 2016 )

Filmography (selection) 
 1996: Trickser (TV-film, film director: Oliver Hirschbiegel)
 1996: Rendezvous des Todes (TV-film,)
 1997:  (TV-film, film director: Oliver Hirschbiegel)
 2002:  (cinema film, film director: Oliver Hirschbiegel)
 2005:  (cinema film, film director: Oliver Hirschbiegel)
 2011: Blaubeerblau (TV-Film, film director: Rainer Kaufmann)
 2012: Der Klügere zieht aus (TV-film, film director: Christoph Schnee)
 2013:  (TV-film, film director: Lancelot von Naso)
 2014: Blindgänger (TV-film, film director: Peter Kahane)

References

External links 
 
 Planet Interview: "Die Talk-Formate sind nicht braver geworden, das Gegenteil ist der Fall." – Interview with Hubertus Meyer-Burckhardt (27 February 2009)
 Management by Hubertus Meyer-Burckhardt 
 GQ-Magazin
 FOCUS
 GALA

German television presenters
German television talk show hosts
German television personalities
German journalists
German male novelists
German male journalists
1956 births
Living people
Mass media people from Kassel
Norddeutscher Rundfunk people
ProSieben people